The Greatest Hits may refer to:

 The Greatest Hits (3 Doors Down album), 2012
 The Greatest Hits (Amii Stewart 2005), 2005
 The Greatest Hits (Australian Crawl album), 2014
 The Greatest Hits (Baby Bird album), 1997
 The Greatest Hits (Boney M. 1993), 1993
 The Greatest Hits (Boney M. album), 2001
 The Greatest Hits (Cheap Trick album), 1991
 The Greatest Hits (Cher album), 1999
 The Greatest Hits (Five Star album), 2004
 The Greatest Hits (Funkoars album), 2006
 The Greatest Hits (GRITS album), 2007
 The Greatest Hits (Il Divo album), 2012
 The Greatest Hits (INXS album), 1994
 The Greatest Hits (Juvenile album), 2004
 The Greatest Hits (Lil Suzy album), 2003
 The Greatest Hits (Lulu album), 2003
 The Greatest Hits (Newsboys album), 2007
 The Greatest Hits (Russell Morris album), 2008
 The Greatest Hits (Sinitta album), 2010
 The Greatest Hits (Texas album), 2000
 Whitney: The Greatest Hits, a 2000 album by Whitney Houston

See also
 Greatest hits album
 List of greatest hits albums